Vijayaratnam Seevaratnam (12 June 1950 – 3 November 2008) was a Malaysian politician, and vice-president of the Parti Gerakan Rakyat Malaysia (PGRM). His late father, S. Seeveratnam was Seremban Barat Member of Parliament (DAP), and his late uncle, S. Rajaratnam served as Minister for Culture, Minister for Labour, Foreign Minister, Deputy Prime Minister and Senior Minister of Singapore. He died accidentally after falling from the roof of his clinic building in Jalan Tunku Hassan, Seremban.

Biography
Vijayaratnam was a former Paulian. He studied in Saint Paul's Institution. He was married to Datin Anuncia Tharumaratnam. Their four children are Ashta, Ayra, Seeralan and Ahlya. From 1997 to 1999, he was a member of the Seremban Municipal Council. In 2002, he became a Malaysian senator, and in 2006 he was Parliamentary Secretary for the Plantation Industries and Commodities Ministry. He was also PGRM International Affairs and Ethnic Relations Bureau chairman and SLC, Negeri Sembilan Vice-Chairman, Sunngai Ujong Branch chairman. Besides political offices he was also an involved with a number of professional and social bodies. He was a Fellow of the Royal Society for the Promotion of Health in London, England. In 1999, he was made an Honorary Fellow of the Indian College of General Practitioners of New Delhi, and in 2007 he was made a Fellow of Faculty of Occupational Medicine, Royal College of Physicians, of Ireland.

He was a life member of the Malaysian Medical Association.

References

1950 births
Malaysian people of Sri Lankan Tamil descent
2008 deaths
Malaysian Hindus
Members of the Dewan Negara
Malaysian people of Indian descent
Accidental deaths from falls